Francis Cleetus is an American cartoonist, painter, and sculptor. He is also a creative director, graphic designer, and copywriter, who has worked at various ad agencies including Foote, Cone & Belding, Ogilvy & Mather, J. Walter Thompson and Doe-Anderson in India, Hong Kong and the US.

A member of the National Cartoonists Society of America, Cleetus is the author of two It's Geek 2 Me tech cartoon compilations. He has created contemporary art inspired by Indian themes for multiple art shows in the US. He has also developed advertising campaigns for global brands including Moen, Maker's Mark, and MTV.

Cleetus lives in Pittsburgh, Pennsylvania, USA, and continues to work on visual art, advertising and marketing communications projects.

It's Geek 2 Me cartoons

A tech cartoon about people and their off-center relationships with technology, "It's Geek 2 Me" pokes fun at its ubiquitous role in people's lives. Cleetus self-published his first compilation of tech cartoons in 2012 titled Wish Your Mouth Had A Backspace Key in the United States through Amazon.com. In 2013, a new compilation titled It's Geek 2 Me – Total Timepass Tech Toons was published by Hachette India for the Indian subcontinent. He has also drawn tech cartoons for the Pittsburgh Tech Council's TEQ magazine, Tata Consultancy Services' @TCS magazine and other publications.

Contemporary Indian art

In February 2012, the Phipps Conservatory and Botanical Gardens in Pittsburgh commissioned Cleetus to recreate ceiling murals from a 16th-century palace for their Tropical Forest India exhibit. The Asia Institute – Crane House in Louisville invited him to host a solo exhibition in June 2017. Pittsburgh's Not-white Collective featured his paintings in their 2018 juried exhibition "In Between the Middle". In January 2018, the Greater Pittsburgh Arts Council (GPAC) showcased "Karmalogue", a themed show that featured Cleetus' paintings, drawings and sculptures as part of the Gallery Crawl organized by the Pittsburgh Cultural Trust. In August 2018, the Westmoreland Cultural Trust put together "Conglomeration", a group show that included his work. The RAW artists organization invited Cleetus in November 2018 to participate in their Pittsburgh creative showcase "Ovation" that featured over 60 artists. In January 2020, his paintings were part of the "Past, Present, Future" exhibit organized by GPAC along with 140 other visual artists.

Advertising campaigns

Cleetus has created multimedia advertising campaigns for global brands at ad agencies in three countries. After spending his formative years at Draft FCB in India, he moved in the mid-nineties to Hong Kong and worked at Ogilvy, JWT and D'Arcy, before relocating to the United States in 2001 to work at Doe-Anderson. In 2007, he moved to Pittsburgh-based agency MARC USA. His advertising campaigns have crossed geographic as well as cultural borders and won creative awards in Asia, Europe and the US.

Photo art for dogs

A lifelong dog lover, Cleetus launched a collection of conceptual photography art just for dogs in 2019. The entire collection is conceived from a dog's perspective of the world, and features larger-than-life dog portraits; fire hydrant centric scenery; dog food still life and renderings of chewed-up tennis balls. The artwork is specifically designed to be hung at a dog's-eye level near the food bowl and brighten up the pet's personal space.

Compilations
 Total Timepass Tech Toons (August 2013, Hachette India)
 Wish Your Mouth Had a Backspace Key (October 2006, Amazon.com)

References

External links 

Cleetus with a 'C' as in Creative
"It's Geek 2 Me" tech toons
Fine Art for Refined Dogs
Total Timepass Tech Toons on Amazon.in
Wish Your Mouth Had A Backspace Key on Amazon.com

Living people
American male artists of Indian descent
21st-century American male artists
American comic strip cartoonists
American copywriters
American art directors
Creative directors
Year of birth missing (living people)